Girardot may refer to:

Places
Girardot, Cundinamarca, a municipality in Cundinamarca, Colombia
Girardot Municipality, Aragua, Venezuela
Girardot Municipality, Cojedes, Venezuela

Other uses
Girardot (surname)
Girardot Argezas, a character from Namco's Soul series

See also
Girardeau, a French surname